William Gold (January 3, 1921 – May 20, 2018) was an American graphic designer best known for thousands of film poster designs. During his 70-year career, Gold worked with some of Hollywood's greatest filmmakers, including Laurence Olivier, Clint Eastwood, Alfred Hitchcock, Stanley Kubrick, Elia Kazan, and Ridley Scott. His first poster was for Yankee Doodle Dandy (1942), and his final work was for J. Edgar (2011). Among Gold's most famous posters are those for Casablanca, The Exorcist and The Sting.

Early life
Bill Gold was born on January 3, 1921, in Brooklyn, New York City, New York, the son of Rose (Sachs) and Paul Gold. After graduating from Samuel J. Tilden High School, he won a scholarship and studied illustration and design at Pratt Institute in New York.

Early career
Gold began his professional design career in 1941, in the advertising department of Warner Bros. His first poster was for the James Cagney musical feature film Yankee Doodle Dandy in 1942, followed soon after by the poster for Casablanca. He was then drafted into the US Army where he was involved in the production of training films. Following his discharge in 1946, he resumed his career designing posters for Warner Bros. where he became head of poster design in 1947.

In 1959 his brother Charlie joined him in the business, and they formed BG Charles to do the film trailers. Charlie operated BG Charles in Los Angeles, while Bill operated in New York City. In 1987, Charlie left the business and retired to Vermont. Charlie Gold died at age 75 on December 25, 2003.

Bill Gold Advertising
In 1962, following the dissolution of the Warner Bros. New York advertising unit, Gold created Bill Gold Advertising in New York City. In 1997 Bill moved the company to Stamford, Connecticut, and continued his business, producing posters for every film Clint Eastwood produced, directed, and/or acted in, among others. In 1994 Bill was awarded a Lifetime Achievement Award from The Hollywood Reporter. Richard Benjamin was the MC for the ceremony at the Directors Guild, and Clint Eastwood presented the award to Bill Gold on behalf of The Hollywood Reporter.

Bill Gold was a member of the Society of Illustrators, the Art Directors Club and the Academy of Motion Picture Arts and Sciences.

Later life
In his later years, Bill Gold resided in Greenwich, Connecticut. He retired in 2003. A limited-edition, oversized one-volume retrospective was published in January 2011 in coordination with his 90th birthday. The same year, Gold came out of retirement when he agreed to create posters for Clint Eastwood's film, J. Edgar. Gold died on 20 May 2018, aged 97, at Greenwich Hospital from complications of Alzheimer's disease.

Film posters

After his first film project, Yankee Doodle Dandy, Gold collaborated with the American film industry's top film directors and film producers. Especially fruitful was Gold's relationship with the illustrator Bob Peak. Gold's work spanned eight decades and was involved in the creation of over 2,000 posters.

1940s
Yankee Doodle Dandy (1942)
Casablanca (1942)
Night and Day (1946)
The Big Sleep (1946)
Escape Me Never (1947)
Winter Meeting (1948)
Rope (1948)

1950s
Strangers on a Train (1951)
A Streetcar Named Desire (1951)
Dial M for Murder (1954)
The Silver Chalice (1954)
East of Eden (1955)
Mister Roberts (1955)
Baby Doll (1955)
Giant (1956)
The Lone Ranger (1956)
Moby Dick (1956)
The Searchers (1956)
The Wrong Man (1956)
A Face in the Crowd (1957)
The James Dean Story (1957)
The Pajama Game (1957)
The Prince and the Showgirl (1957)
Top Secret Affair (1957)
The Old Man and the Sea (1958)

1960s
Splendor in the Grass (1961)
Gypsy (1962)
The Music Man (1962)
My Fair Lady (1964)
Robin and the 7 Hoods (1964)
Sex and the Single Girl (1964)
The Great Race (1965)
Who's Afraid of Virginia Woolf? (1966)
Bonnie and Clyde (1967)
Camelot (1967)
Cool Hand Luke (1967)
The Fox (1967)
Wait Until Dark (1967)
Barbarella (1968)
Bullitt (1968)
Funny Girl (1968)
A Dream of Kings (1969)
The Illustrated Man (1969)
The Wild Bunch (1969)

1970s

Last of the Mobile Hot Shots (1970)
No Blade of Grass (1970)
Ryan's Daughter (1970)
Soldier Blue (1970)
Start the Revolution Without Me (1970)
The Go-Between (1970)
There Was a Crooked Man... (1970)
There's a Girl in My Soup (1970)
Dorian Gray (1970)
A Clockwork Orange (Early Draft, 1971)
Woodstock (1970)
Diamonds are Forever (1971)
Fiddler on the Roof (1970)
Get Carter (1970)
Dirty Harry (1971)
Klute (1971)
McCabe & Mrs. Miller (1971)
Medicine Ball Caravan (1971)
Deliverance (1972)
Jeremiah Johnson (1972)
Joe Kidd (1972)
The Life and Times of Judge Roy Bean (1972)
Lady Sings the Blues (1972)
The Trial of the Catonsville Nine (1972)
What's Up, Doc? (1972)
Day for Night (1973)
The Exorcist (1973)
High Plains Drifter (1973)
Magnum Force (1973)
O Lucky Man (1973)
Oklahoma Crude (1973)
Papillon (1973)
Pat Garrett & Billy the Kid (1973)
Scarecrow (1973)
Steelyard Blues (1973)
The Sting (1973)
The Way We Were (1973)
The Front Page (1974)
Law and Disorder (1974)
Mame (1974)
99 and 44/100% Dead (1974)
The Odessa File (1974)
The Sugarland Express (1974)
The Yakuza (1974)
Zandy's Bride (1974)
Barry Lyndon (1975)
Dog Day Afternoon (1975)
The Drowning Pool (1975)
Funny Lady (1975)
Hard Times (1975)

Mahogany (1975)
Mister Quilp (1975)
The Prisoner of Second Avenue (1975)
Rafferty and the Gold Dust Twins (1975)
Return of the Pink Panther (1975)
Rooster Cogburn (1975)
Rosebud (1975)
The Great Waldo Pepper (1975)
The Hindenburg (1975)
The Wilby Conspiracy (1975)
A Matter of Time (1976)
A Star Is Born (1976)
All the President's Men (1976)
The Duchess and the Dirtwater Fox (1976)
The Enforcer (1976)
Fellini's Casanova (1976)
Gable and Lombard (1976)
Marathon Man (1976)
The Outlaw Josey Wales (1976)
Portnoy's Complaint (1976)
The Ritz (1976)
W.C. Fields and Me (1976)
A Piece of the Action (1977)
Exorcist II: The Heretic (1977)
Fun with Dick and Jane (1977)
Greased Lightning (1977)
Julia (1977)
Smokey and the Bandit (1977)
The Gauntlet (1977)
The Sentinel (1977)
Twilight's Last Gleaming (1977)
Bloodbrothers (1978)
California Suite (1978)
Convoy (1978)
The Invasion of the Body Snatchers (1978)
Movie Movie (1978)
Same Time, Next Year (1978)
Goin' Coconuts (1978)
The Wiz (1978)
Agatha (1979)
Chapter Two (1979)
Escape from Alcatraz (1979)
The Great Santini (1979)
Hair (1979)
Scavenger Hunt (1979)
The Bell Jar (1979)
The Promise (1979)

1980s

Any Which Way You Can (1980)
Bronco Billy (1980)
The Dogs of War (1980)
Fame (1980)
Heaven's Gate (1980)
The Jazz Singer (1980)
The Last Married Couple in America (1980)
Little Miss Marker (1980)
The Long Riders (1980)
The Nude Bomb (1980)
Somewhere in Time (1980)
The Stunt Man (1980)
Those Lips, Those Eyes (1980)
Clash of the Titans (1981)
Endless Love (1981)
For Your Eyes Only (1981)
The Four Seasons (1981)
Hard Country (1981)
On Golden Pond (1981)
The Funhouse (1981)
Deathtrap (1982)
Evil Under the Sun (1982)
Firefox (1982)
Honkytonk Man (1982)
I, the Jury (1982)
My Favorite Year (1982)
Breathless (1983)
Cross Creek (1983)
Eddie Macon's Run (1983)

Gorky Park (1983)
High Road to China (1983)
Never Say Never Again (1983)
The Sting II (1983)
Sudden Impact (1983)
Champions (1984)
City Heat (1984)
Harry & Son (1984)
Splash (1984)
The River (1984)
Tightrope (1984)
Pale Rider (1985)
Best Shot (1986)
Heartbreak Ridge (1986)
Platoon (1986)
Hamburger Hill (1987)
Orphans (1987)
The Believers (1987)
The Untouchables (1987)
Bird (1988)
Colors (1988)
The Dead Pool (1988)
Mississippi Burning (1988)
Moonwalker (1988)
The Accused (1988)
Thelonious Monk: Straight, No Chaser (1988)
Great Balls of Fire! (1989)
Night Visitor (1989)
Pink Cadillac (1989)

1990s

White Hunter Black Heart (1990)
Reversal of Fortune (1990)
Funny About Love (1990)
State of Grace (1990)
The Field (1990)
The Rookie (1990)
F/X2 (1991)
Unforgiven (1992)

In the Line of Fire (1993)
A Perfect World (1993)
The Bridges of Madison County (1995)
The Stars Fell on Henrietta (1995)
The Old Curiosity Shop (1995)
Absolute Power (1997)
True Crime (1999)

2000s

Space Cowboys (2000)

Mystic River (2003)

2010s

J. Edgar (2011)

Collaborating directors

Clint Eastwood
Alfred Hitchcock
Stanley Kubrick
Ridley Scott
Sidney Lumet
Elia Kazan
John Schlesinger
George Roy Hill
Robert Altman
William Friedkin
Arthur Penn
Miloš Forman
Peter Yates

Michael Curtiz
Ron Howard
Joshua Logan
John Boorman
Don Siegel
Vincente Minnelli
Alan J. Pakula
Herbert Ross
François Truffaut
Buddy Van Horn
Richard Benjamin

Collaborating producers

Clint Eastwood
Jack L. Warner
Hal B. Wallis
Tennessee Williams
Philip D'Antoni
Tony Bill
Stanley Kubrick
Martin Bregman

Samuel Z. Arkoff
Walter Hill
Ray Harryhausen
Richard D. Zanuck
Andrew Lazar
Robert Lorenz
Jay Presson Allen
Tom Rooker
David Valdes
Bob Daley
Jon Kilik

Best Picture Winners
Casablanca (1942)
My Fair Lady (1964)
The Sting (1973)
Ordinary People (1980)
Platoon (1986)
Unforgiven (1992)

References

Further reading
 Bill Gold reflects on his art and his career.
 This feature article about Gold's career has a link to fourteen images of his posters.

External links
1994 Hollywood Reporter Lifetime Achievement Award video 
Meet Bill Gold: The Man Behind the Most Iconic Movie Posters Ever

1921 births
2018 deaths
American graphic designers
Film poster artists
Film and television title designers
Artists from Brooklyn
Pratt Institute alumni
Deaths from dementia in Connecticut
Deaths from Alzheimer's disease